Anat Biletzki (born 1952) is a professor of philosophy at Tel Aviv University and Quinnipiac University in Hamden, CT.

Biletzki was born in Jerusalem. She was a member of B'tselem, an Israeli human rights NGO, acting as chairperson from 2001 to 2006, and has served as a B'tselem Board member since 1995.

Biletzki is a member of the executive board of FFIPP-I (Faculty for Israeli-Palestinian Peace International), which describes itself as "a network of Palestinian, Israeli, and International faculty, and students, working in solidarity for a complete end of the occupation and just peace."

Biletzki is unusual in her explicit and controversial criticism of "Jewish Israel" as distinct from Israel as a nation or political bodies within Israel. In a New York Times opinion piece she writes that "[the 2015 minority government bloc] is unambiguous in its Jewish, nationalistic agenda," and that "norms of exclusive Jewish rights and exclusion of Arab citizens" are inherent to Zionism.  As well, Biletzki suggested that controversial statements made by Prime Minister Benjamin Netenyahu in the days before the election, specifically the assertion that a two-state solution would never happen during his tenure, and an expression of anxiety that supposedly large amounts of Israeli Arabs were voting, represent implicit norms of "Zionist, Jewish Israel."

References

External links
"Life in the O.T.: Anat Biletzki" Interview by Eyal Danieli, The Brooklyn Rail (June 2004)

1952 births
Living people
Israeli human rights activists
Women human rights activists
Jewish philosophers
Israeli women philosophers
Tel Aviv University alumni
Academic staff of Tel Aviv University
20th-century Israeli philosophers
21st-century Israeli philosophers
B'Tselem people